Macushla (also called Unauthorised Road) is a 1937 British drama film directed by Alex Bryce and starring Liam Gaffney, Pamela Wood and Jimmy Mageean. The plot concerns a crackdown on an arms smuggling operation across the Northern Irish border.

Cast
 Pamela Wood ...  Kathleen Muldoon 
 Liam Gaffney ...  Jim O'Grady 
 Jimmy Mageean ...  Pat Muldoon 
 E.J. Kennedy ...  Hugh Connolly 
 Kitty Kirwan ...  Bridget 
 Bryan Herbert ...  Pat Rooney 
 Edgar K. Bruce ...  Dean McLaglen 
 Max Adrian ...  Kerry Muldoon

References

External links

1937 films
1937 drama films
Films directed by Alex Bryce
British drama films
British black-and-white films
1930s English-language films
1930s British films